William Conner  was an Irish politician.

Conner was born in County Cork and educated at  Trinity College, Dublin.

Connere represented  Killyleagh from 1761 to 1766.

References

People from County Cork
Irish MPs 1727–1760
Members of the Parliament of Ireland (pre-1801) for County Cork constituencies
Alumni of Trinity College Dublin